Aleksey Petrukhanov (born 15 May 1972) is a Russian athlete. He competed in the men's long jump at the 1996 Summer Olympics.

References

1972 births
Living people
Athletes (track and field) at the 1996 Summer Olympics
Russian male long jumpers
Olympic athletes of Russia
Place of birth missing (living people)